Patsy King (born 16 September 1930) is an Australian retired actress known for work in both theatre and television. She has been a children's television presenter, theatre director, playwright and worked in commercials, and in radio and voice over work, particularly in her early career in the United Kingdom.

King started her career exclusively as a radio and classical stage actress, with roles in everything from Shakespeare to Peter Pan starting from 1951 until 1990. with a brief return to the stage post-retirement in 2009. Her career in television and children's entertainment started in the early 1960s and extended until 1984. She is known for her roles in TV series including Bellbird as Kate Andrews.

Biography

Early life
King was born in Melbourne, Victoria, Australia on 16 September 1930. She aspired to become a dress designer and spent her early years in the United Kingdom. Returning to Australia and opting to work in the theatre, she trained as a classical stage actress, specialising in straight drama and Shakespearean actress with the Melbourne National Theatre. In 1959, she married English-born theatre impresario John Sumner, the founder and artistic director of the mentioned company. They divorced in 1967.

Career

Theatre
King started her career exclusively in theatre in the early 1950s, appearing in dramatic and period pieces and had numerous stage credits including Victoria Regina, The Miser,  Summer of the Seventeenth Doll, Richard II, Blithe Spirit. Absurd Person Singular, Half a Sixpence, A Lovely Sunday for Creve Coeur, Love for Love and Love Letters. King earned awards, including the Erik Award and the Melbourne Critics Awards for Agnes in Four Poster, before retiring the stage in 1984. She turned her hand to writing and directing her own plays in the late 1980s.

Television

Acting roles
After appearing in a few made-for-TV movies in the early 1960s she appeared in a variety of television serials from the late-1960s, including a role in the rural series Bellbird and guest roles in the Crawford Productions series Hunter, The Box, and in their police procedurals Matlock Police, Division 4 and playing 14 different character parts in Homicide. She also acted in Power Without Glory, The Sullivans, Chopper Squad, Bluey, Cop Shop, Out of Love and the comedy series Good Morning, Mr. Doubleday. 

Internationally she is known as an original cast member of Prisoner, internationally known as Prisoner: Cell Block H, as the first governor of the fictional Wentworth Detention Centre. She appeared in 351 episodes as well-coiffured Governor/Warden Erica Davidson. The role of Governor was originally offered to Googie Withers, who had played the role in the unrelated but similar British prison series Within These Walls. After the series ended, King toured the United Kingdom in a stage play based on the series.

King wore high heels and an up-style French roll hairstyle when playing the role, as series creator Reg Watson wanted her to tower over the prison inmates. During her tenure on the show her character was kidnapped, escaped from a burning building, was sacked, reinstated, resigned, bickered with the Department, suffered family trauma, including her niece ending up in the prison on drug charges, had numerous failed romances, left her husband in a restaurant covered in cobwebs and was the victim of a shooting during the annual end of season cliffhanger.

Children's presenter and entertainer
She was an early presenter on the ABC TV show Play School, and also appeared on The Magic Circle Club and Adventure Island.

Selected roles

Theatre
Source = AusStage

Filmography

FILM

TELEVISION

References

External links
 

1930 births
Living people
Australian film actresses
Australian soap opera actresses
Australian stage actresses
Actresses from Melbourne
Australian children's television presenters
20th-century Australian actresses
21st-century Australian actresses
Australian women television presenters